The IMOCA 60 Class yacht Credit Agricole IV was designed and built by Marc Lombard the boats original skipper formed a company "Jeantot Marine" which built the boat it was launched Jan 1989. The boat was lost while unofficial competing in the 1996-1997 Vendee Globe with Italian skipper Raphael Dinelli dramatically rescued by fellow competitor Pete Goss.

Racing results

References 

1990s sailing yachts
Sailing yachts designed by Marc Lombard
Vendée Globe boats
IMOCA 60